Leroy Jones (born February 20, 1958) is a jazz trumpeter. Born in New Orleans, Louisiana, Jones began playing trumpet at the age of ten, and by the time he was 12 was leading the Fairview Baptist Church Marching Band, a group of young musicians organized by jazz guitarist and banjo player Danny Barker. When the musicians' union forced Barker to disband the group in 1974, Jones became a union musician and took over the running of the group, renamed the Hurricane Brass Band, himself. In 1975 or 1976, he left the group, touring for a time with Eddie Vinson and Della Reese before forming his own group, the Leroy Jones Quintet. In 1991, Jones joined the big band of Harry Connick, Jr., and the exposure with Connick's band (including the opportunity for the Leroy Jones Quintet to open for Connick, which they did in 1994), led to Jones' releasing his first album under his own name; Mo' Cream From The Crop came out on the Columbia label in 1994. The Leroy Jones Quintet continues to tour and record, and since 2004 Jones has also appeared with the Preservation Hall Jazz Band and Dr. John.

Discography
1975 - Leroy Jones and his Hurricane Marching Brass Band of New Orleans
1994 - Mo' Cream from the Crop
1996 - Props for Pops
1999 - City of Sounds
2002 - Back to My Roots
2003 - Wonderful Christmas: A Brass Salute to the King of Kings
2005 - New Orleans Brass Band Music: Memories of the Fairview & Hurricane Band
2007 - Soft Shoe
2009 - Sweeter Than a Summer Breeze

References

"Trumpeter Leroy Jones takes New Orleans jazz to the world" - The Advocate
https://web.archive.org/web/20140226142658/http://theadvocate.com/entertainment/6979454-84/trumpeter-leroy-jones-takes-new
"Leroy Jones - Blowing Up A Storm" - OffBeat
http://www.offbeat.com/2013/08/01/leroy-jones-blowing-up-storm/

External links

Leroy Jones on the Spirit of New Orleans Website
"Trumpeter Leroy Jones takes New Orleans jazz to the world". The Advocate, October 14, 2013
"Leroy Jones: Blowing Up A Storm". OffBeat, August 1, 2013
"Roots of 'Jazz". BestofNewOrleans.com, April 8, 2003

1958 births
Living people
Jazz musicians from New Orleans
American jazz trumpeters
American male trumpeters
Dixieland trumpeters
21st-century trumpeters
21st-century American male musicians
American male jazz musicians
Preservation Hall Jazz Band members